Ćukovac is a Serbo-Croatian toponym that may refer to:

 Ćukovac, an urban neighborhood of Belgrade, the capital of Serbia
 Ćukovac, Bojnik, a village in the Bojnik municipality of Jablanica District
 Ćukovac, Prokuplje, a village in the Prokuplje municipality of Toplica District
 Ćukovac, Vranje, a village in the Vranje municipality of Pčinja District
 Ćukovac, Kneževo, a village in Kneževo municipality of Republika Srpska